Tolidostena is a subgenus of beetles in the family Mordellidae, containing the following species:

Tolidostena hayashii (Kiyoyama, 1991)
Tolidostena taiwana (Kiyoyama, 1987)

References

Mordellidae
Insect subgenera